Purpurogallin is an aglycone natural product. It is an orange-red solid that is soluble in polar organic solvents but not in water.  Its glycoside (ether-linked to sugar), called dryophantin, is found in nutgalls and oak barks.  Purpurogallin can be prepared by oxidation of pyrogallol with sodium periodate.

Medicinal aspects
Purpurogallin is bioactive It can inhibit 2-hydroxy and 4-hydroxyestradiol methylation by catechol-O-methyltransferase. It potently and specifically inhibits TLR1/TLR2 activation pathway.

References

Polyphenols
Tropolones
Tetrols
Azulenes
Pyrogallols